Neuer may refer to:

 Neuer (surname)

Organizations
 Neuer Botanischer Garten der Universität Göttingen, Göttingen
 Neuer Botanischer Garten Marburg, Marburg
 Neuer Botanischer Garten Tübingen, Tübingen

Places
 Neuer Dom, Linz Cathedral, Austria
 Borkum Neuer Light, a German lighthouse
 Neuer Marstall, a historic building in Berlin, Germany

Music and entertainment
 Neuer Deutscher Film (or JDF, "Junger Deutscher Film"), a period in German cinema
 Ein neuer Tag ("A new day"), the second studio album by German pop/rock band Juli

See also 
 Neuner (disambiguation)
 Neumann (disambiguation)